WORA may mean:

WORA (AM), a radio station (760 AM) licensed to Mayagüez, Puerto Rico
WORA-TV, a television station (channel 5) licensed to Mayagüez, Puerto Rico
Write once, run anywhere (WORA), a slogan used by Sun Microsystems